Greeneocharis  is a genus of flowering plants in the family Boraginaceae. There are about 63 species and its native range extends from western U.S.A. down to northwestern Mexico and to western Argentina. It is part of subtribe of Amsinckiinae.

It was once thought to be a either a subgenus or synonym of Cryptantha , before being segregated out due to molecular phylogenetic analysis.

Description
It is an annual herb, with cushion-like, roots, which can have red-purple tinge. It has branches ascending to erect on a slender stem, generally strigose (having straight hairs all pointing in more or less the same direction). The leaves are sessile, arranged alternate and congested at the branch tips. They are linear, oblanceolate, or narrowly oblong (in shape) and hairy. The inflorescence is spike-like cymes. They have flower bracts. The flower consists of calyx lobes which are fused at base, and the tube is circumscissile in fruit (meaning it splits or opens along a circumference). After it has flowered it produces a fruit (or seed capsule), which has a pedicel  0-0.5 mm in fruit. The fruit axis is similar to the nutlet length. It can have between 2-4 nutlets, which are generally similar (or dissimilar), smooth to roughened and without ridges. The margin is rounded and has an attachment scar abutted near apex, forked and gapped at the base. The style is extended to or just below nutlet tips.

Taxonomy
The Latin specific epithet Greeneocharis is derived from California botanist Edward Lee Greene (1843–1915) and charis which means "beauty, delight".

It was first published Nat. Pflanzenfam., Register on page 460 in 1899.

Then in 1924, Ivan M. Johnston wrote that the genus of Oreocarya could be combined with Cryptantha. Edwin Blake Payson in 1927 (A Monograph of the section Oreocarya of Cryptantha, Ann. Mo. Bot. Gard. 14:211-358) agreed with Johnston and he had four sections in
Cryptantha: Eucryptantha (= Cryptantha), Geocarya, Krynitzkia (inclusive of Eremocarya, Greeneocharis, and Johnstonella), and Oreocarya.
Larry Higgins (1971), another expert on the perennial taxa, published a revised monograph of Oreocarya, and agreed with Johnston and Payson on the
inclusion of Oreocarya within Cryptantha, but also elevating the four sections of Johnston (1927) and Payson (1927) to subgenera. Although they were sometimes still called synonyms of Cryptantha.

In 2012, the phylogenetic relationship of members of the genus Cryptantha was carried out, based on dna sequencing analyses, it was then
proposed that the resurrection of the following genera; Eremocarya, Greeneocharis, Johnstonella, and also Oreocarya.

Species
2 accepted species;
 Greeneocharis circumscissa 
 Greeneocharis circumscissa var. circumscissa
 Greeneocharis circumscissa var. hispida 
 Greeneocharis circumscissa var. rosulata 
 Greeneocharis similis

Distribution
The genus is found in the United States (within the states of Arizona, California, Colorado, Nevada, Oregon, Utah, Washington and Wyoming) and also in north western Mexico and southern and northwestern Argentina.

References

Other sources
 Cronquist, A. et al. 1972-. Intermountain flora.
 Johnston, I. M. 1927. Studies in the Boraginaceae VI. A revision of the South American Boraginoideae. Contr. Gray Herb. 78:31.

Boraginoideae
Boraginaceae genera
Plants described in 1899
Flora of the Northwestern United States
Flora of the Southwestern United States
Flora of Northwestern Mexico
Flora of Northeast Argentina
Flora of South Argentina